Golden Apple is a South Korean television series starring Park Sol-mi, Kim Ji-hoon, Ji Hyun-woo, Go Eun-ah and Jung Chan. It aired on KBS2 from November 16, 2005 to February 23, 2006 on Wednesdays and Thursdays at 21:55 for 30 episodes. The story about four siblings living in a village in the 1960s, and a woman fighting to clear her dead father's name after he is wrongly accused of her stepmother's murder.

Golden Apple received average viewership ratings of 17.43%, making it the 13th highest-rated Korean drama in 2006.

Plot
Kim Chun-dong (Choi Il-hwa) is a widowed farmer with one daughter, Kyung-sook (Lee Young-ah), and two sons, Kyung-gu (Kim Myung-jae) and Kyung-min (Park Ji-bin). Kyung-sook is committed to maintaining the household after the passing of their mother, and the villagers praise her sweet, cheerful nature and hardworking attitude. Everyday chores leave her little time for fun, but she does shed her tough exterior for Park Jong-gyu, the farm owner's son. A student at Seoul National University, Jong-gyu visits on occasion to the delight of Kyung-sook.

Her father Chun-dong marries again, and the woman (Bang Eun-hee) has a six-year-daughter, Keum-shil (Yoo Yeon-mi). The new siblings live a humble but happy life in the countryside. But the marriage is not a happy one and Keum-shil's mother continues her affair with Park Byung-sam (Lee Deok-hwa) a rich landlord in the village who is running for a seat in the Parliament. After the election, her body is discovered floating in the river and Chun-dong is wrongly accused of being the killer. He confesses after being tortured by the police and later dies in custody before the trial. Park Byung-sam, who is in fact Keum-shil's real father, orders his brother-in-law Jung (Lee Ki-young) to adopt Keum-shil, then gives him a job at the Intelligence Office in Seoul.

Years later, Kyung-sook (Park Sol-mi) has also moved to Seoul and is working hard to raise her brothers (Kim Ji-hoon, Ji Hyun-woo). She vows that she will clear her father's name and find the real killer. Park Byung-sam remains her number one suspect even though she was in love with his son, Jong-gyu (Jung Chan).

Cast

Kim family 
 Park Sol-mi as Kyung-sook
 Lee Young-ah as young Kyung-sook
 Kim Ji-hoon as Kyung-gu
 Kim Myung-jae as young Kyung-gu
 Ji Hyun-woo as Kyung-min
 Park Ji-bin as young Kyung-min
 Go Eun-ah as Keum-shil
 Yoo Yeon-mi as young Keum-shil
 Choi Il-hwa as Kim Chun-dong
 Bang Eun-hee as stepmother, Keum-shil's mother
 Lee Joo-shil as Kyung-sook's paternal grandmother

Park family 
 Jung Chan as Park Jong-gyu
 Lee Deok-hwa as Park Byung-sam
 Lee Mi-ji as Ms. Jung, Byung-sam's wife

Jung family 
 Lee In-hye as Jung Hong-yeon
 Park Da-young as young Hong-yeon
 Lee Ki-young as Chief Jung
 Lee Jong-nam as Ms. Im, Jung's wife

Jo family 
 Jo Mi-ryung as Jo Mi-ja
 Kim Soo-yong as Jo Bong-joo
 Hwang Beom-shik as Jo Hong-man
 Kim Dong-joo as Ja-shil, Hong-man's wife

Hwang family 
 Moon Won-joo as Hwang Soon-shik
 Yoon Seok-hyun as young Soon-shik
 Jung Seung-ho as Hwang Chang-han
 Baek Seung-hyeon as Hwang Sang-taek

Extended cast 
 Yoon Hye-kyung as Choi Seong-hee
 Noh Hyun-hee as Oh Mi-ja
 Kim Hae-in as Joo Jung-eun
 Im Yae-won as Han Hee-young
 Kim Byung-ki as CEO Han
 Won Jong-rye as Hee-young's mother
 Jung Heung-chae as Mr. Lee, Byung-sam's campaign manager
 Lee Woo-seok as Mr. Hong, Byung-sam's chauffeur
 Go In-beom as Detective Shin
 Kim Soo-hong as Bong-gu
 Kim Ha-kyun as co-president Kim
 Ham Sung-min as Child
 Lee Won-hee as Doctor Kang
 Yeo Woon-kay

Awards
2005 KBS Drama Awards
 Best Young Actress - Yoo Yeon-mi
 Best Young Actor - Park Ji-bin

2006 Baeksang Arts Awards
 Best New Actress (TV) - Lee Young-ah

References

External links
 Golden Apple official KBS website 

Korean Broadcasting System television dramas
2005 South Korean television series debuts
2006 South Korean television series endings
South Korean romance television series
South Korean suspense television series
Television series by JS Pictures